Rıza Kayaalp (born 10 October 1989) is a Turkish wrestler competing in the 130 kg division of Greco-Roman wrestling. He is a five times world champion and eleven times European champion. He is a graduate of the Aksaray University Physical Education and Sports Academy and studies his master's degree at Bozok University.

Wrestling career 
Kayaalp won a gold medal in Greco-Roman wrestling (120 kg division) at the 2009 Mediterranean Games. He is also a world champion, beating Mijaín López on the finals of the 2011 World Wrestling Championships in Istanbul, Turkey.

Kayaalp qualified for the 2012 Summer Olympics, where he won bronze medal at Greco-Roman style in 120 kg.

He was the flag bearer of Turkey at the opening ceremony of the 2013 Mediterranean Games, where he won the gold medal in the 120 kg division by beating Radhwen Chebbi of Tunisia 2–0.

At the 2013 European Wrestling Championships, Riza Kayaalp won a gold medal in the 120 kg division.

At the European Wrestling Championship in 2014, Kayaalp won a gold medal.

At the 2014 World Wrestling Championships, Kayaalp received a silver medal after losing to Mijain Lopez 2–0 in the final of the 130 kg Greco-Roman style division.

At the 2016 European Wrestling Championships, Kayaalp won a gold medal.

Kayaalp once again lost against his Cuban rival Mijain Lopez at the Rio de Janeiro Games. The Cuban, who lost to Kayaalp in last year's world finals, scored in only 15 seconds to essentially seal the match. He competed at the Wrestling at the 2016 Summer Olympics – Men's Greco-Roman 130 kg, winning the silver medal.

Kayaalp won a gold medal, the seventh of his career, at the 2017 European Wrestling Championships in Serbia

Kayaalp bagged the gold medal at the 2017 World Wrestling Championships in Paris. Competing in the 130 kg (286 pounds) Greco-Roman category, Kayaalp defeated his Estonian rival Heiki Nabi to become the world wrestling champion.

Kayaalp has won the gold medal at the European Wrestling Championships in Kaspiysk in Russia's northern Caucasus Republic of Dagestan. Competing in the 130 kg category, Kayaalp defeated Russian opponent Vitalii Shchur by a 2–1 score. The victory marked Kayaalp's eighth European title – seven are consecutive – equalizing another Turkish wrestling legend Hamza Yerlikaya's record.

Kayaalp became the European wrestling champion for the ninth time in the 2019 championships held in Bucharest, Romania. After defeating his Georgian rival, Iakobi Kajaia 3:0 in the finals, Kayaalp took the gold medal to become the 2019 champion in 130 kilogram category. Winning his ninth title, Kayaalp became the most decorated Turkish wrestlers in European tournaments.

Kayaalp clinched gold at 2019 World Wrestling Championships. With a 3–1 win over Oscar Pino Hinds, Kayaalp became the first Turkish Greco-Roman wrestler to have won four world titles. With his latest title Kayaalp also surpassed wrestling greats Hamza Yerlikaya and Selçuk Çebi, who have three titles in Greco-Roman wrestling each. He also equalized Hüseyin Akbaş's record in freestyle wrestling.

Kayaalp won another gold by beating his Estonian rival Heiki Nabi 3–1 in the Greco-Roman 130 kilos in China, at the International Military Sports Council (CISM) World Games, an Olympic event where soldiers compete.

Kayaalp was chosen as the 2020 Athlete of the Year at the 66th Gillette Milliyet Athlete of the Year awards.

Kayaalp clinched his 10th European wrestling title by beating Georgia's Iakobi Kajaia 3–1 in the Greco-Roman 130 kg final. Kayaalp had to wait until the final match of the day to claim his historic title. In the final, he faced Iakobi Kajaia from Georgia, the same wrestler he had defeated to win the 2019 European title. Kayaalp won the final 3–1 after scoring a takedown and one point for Kajaia's passivity. He gave up a point for his own inactivity in the second round.

Rıza Kayaalp defeated Iran's Amin Mirzazadeh to win his third Olympic medal at the 2020 Tokyo Olympics.

In 2022, he won one of the bronze medals in his event at the Vehbi Emre & Hamit Kaplan Tournament, the first United World Wrestling Ranking Series event of the year, held in Istanbul, Turkey. He  won the gold medal in the men's 130 kg event at the 2022 European Wrestling Championships held in Budapest, Hungary. Kayaalp claimed a 4–0 victory over Danila Sotnikov from Italy in the 130 kg Greco-Roman division in Hungary's capital. Rıza Kayaalp won his eleventh gold medal in the 130 kg Greco-Roman division. He  won the gold medal in the men's 130 kg event at the Matteo Pellicone Ranking Series 2022, the third United World Wrestling Ranking Series event of the year, held in Rome, Italy. Kayaalp claimed a 4–0 victory over Sabah Shariati from Azerbaijan in the 130 kg Greco-Roman division. Rıza Kayaalp beats Amin Mirzazadeh of Iran in men's Greco-Roman 130 kg at 2022 World Wrestling Championships in Belgrade, Serbia. Kayaalp bagged his fifth world championship as he won gold medal in men's Greco-Roman 120 kg at 2011 Istanbul and three golds in men's Greco-Roman 130 kg at 2015 Las Vegas, 2017 Paris and 2019 Nur-Sultan. Kayaalp became the first Turkish wrestler to win the world championship for the 5th time. Kayaalp, said he had been battling a shoulder injury and other ailments over the past two months during his preparation for Belgrade. "Preparing for the World Championships with the injuries was very hard for me, especially in the last training camp it is very important to stay injury free," Kayaalp said. "I knew that the injuries will affect me in the final fight, so I changed my tactic a little bit. My defense is very good and we knew that."

Major results

Wrestling record

See also
 Taha Akgül

References

External links
 

Living people
1989 births
Wrestlers at the 2008 Summer Olympics
Wrestlers at the 2012 Summer Olympics
Wrestlers at the 2016 Summer Olympics
Olympic wrestlers of Turkey
Sportspeople from Yozgat
Olympic silver medalists for Turkey
Olympic bronze medalists for Turkey
Aksaray University alumni
Olympic medalists in wrestling
Medalists at the 2012 Summer Olympics
Medalists at the 2016 Summer Olympics
European Games medalists in wrestling
European Games gold medalists for Turkey
Wrestlers at the 2015 European Games
Turkish male sport wrestlers
World Wrestling Championships medalists
European champions for Turkey
Mediterranean Games gold medalists for Turkey
Competitors at the 2009 Mediterranean Games
Competitors at the 2013 Mediterranean Games
Universiade medalists in wrestling
Mediterranean Games medalists in wrestling
Universiade gold medalists for Turkey
European Wrestling Championships medalists
Medalists at the 2013 Summer Universiade
Wrestlers at the 2020 Summer Olympics
Medalists at the 2020 Summer Olympics
European Wrestling Champions
21st-century Turkish people
World Wrestling Champions